General Elly Tumwine (12 April 1954–25 August 2022), was a Ugandan military officer, professional artist, and educator. He was the former Security Minister in the Cabinet of Uganda, from March 2018 until 2021. He retired from active military service in July 2022.

He served as commander of the National Resistance Army from 1984 to 1987. He was one of the highest-ranking members of the Ugandan military who recently called on police to shoot at protester. .  He  also ordered the military to kidnap, illegally incarcerate and send opposition members to be tried in military courts based on trumped up charges, which resulted in Bobi Wine supporters suing for Human Rights violations. This led the United States of America to sanction the Ugandan generals over human rights abuses.  He was a member of the Ugandan Parliament, representing the Uganda People's Defence Force (UPDF).

Early life and education
Elly Tumwine was born on 12 April 1954, in Burunga, Mbarara District. He attended Burunga Primary School, Mbarara High School and St. Henry's College Kitovu, before joining Makerere University, where in 1977, he graduated with the degree of Bachelor of Arts in Fine Art together with the Diploma in Education; abbreviated:BA (FA)/Dip. Ed. He specialised in the history of art painting.

He subsequently graduated from the Cadet Officers Course at the Tanzania Military Academy at Monduli. He also attended the Senior Command Course at the Uganda Senior Command and Staff College at Kimaka, in Jinja, Uganda, being a member of the pioneer class that graduated in 2005. Tumwine also holds further military qualifications from the military academy in Vystry, in the Soviet Union.

Military career
In 1978, he interrupted his teaching career to join the FRONASA forces led by Yoweri Museveni to fight the Idi Amin regime. In 1981, when Museveni went to the bush to form the National Resistance Army (NRA), Elly Tumwine went with him. He is reported to have fired the first shot in the National Resistance Army War, which propelled the National Resistance Army and National Resistance Movement into power in Uganda in 1986. During the fighting between the NRA and the UNLA, Tumwine sustained facial injuries that led to loss of sight in one eye. In 1984, Tumwine was named Commander of the Army, a post he held until 1987, when he was succeeded by General Salim Saleh. Over the years, he served in various positions, including:

Minister of State for Defence in 1989.
Director General of the External Security Organization (ESO) from 1994 until 1996.
Presidential Adviser from 1996 until 1998
Chairman of the High Command Appeals Committee from 1986 until 1999.

He was also continuously represented the UPDF in the Ugandan Parliament since 1986.

In September 2005, he was promoted to the rank of general in the UPDF and named to chair the UPDF General Court Marshal.

On Monday 16 May 2022, Tumwiine was among 34 generals who were retired from the UPDF.

Human Rights
Elly Tumwine has regularly been connected to violence against Ugandans. After Bobi Wine was arrested on 18 November 2020 in Luuka, protests broke out which were met with excessive violence.

Art
Immediately after graduating from Makerere University in 1977, Elly Tumwine embarked on a teaching career in various schools in Uganda, teaching fine art. After the National Resistance Movement victory in 1986, he resumed his art. While serving as the commander of the NRA, he designed the flag, the emblem and the green and camouflage uniforms of the army. He was appointed the chairman of the board of trustees of the National Cultural Centre. In 1992, he launched his company, The Creations Limited, to promote the arts and crafts industry, encouraging artistic values and creativity. The company is a member of several Ugandan organisations, including:

 Uganda Manufacturers Association
 Uganda Small Scale Industries Association
 Uganda Leather Allied Industries Association

Death
Tumwine collapsed at a wedding and was admitted to Nakasero Hospital in Kampala, sometime in July 2022. When his condition deteriorated, he was flown to the Aga Khan University Hospital, Nairobi. He died there on 25 August 2022. He was 68 years old.

See also

References

External links
 About Elly Tumwine the Artist
 Profile at Uganda Parliament Website
  Newspaper Interview In 2012
Photos of Elly Tumwine At Google.com

1954 births
2022 deaths
People from Mbarara District
Members of the Parliament of Uganda
Ugandan generals
Ugandan artists
Ugandan educators
Makerere University alumni
Tanzania Military Academy alumni
Uganda Senior Command and Staff College alumni
Ugandan military personnel
People educated at Mbarara High School
21st-century Ugandan politicians